Samuel Hobart Taylor Dorman was Archdeacon of Cloyne  from 1936 until 1951.

Dorman was educated at Trinity College, Dublin and ordained in 1889.  After  curacies at Youghal and Knockmourne he was the incumbent at Mogeely from 1892; and Precentor of Cloyne Cathedral from 1936.

References

Alumni of Trinity College Dublin
Archdeacons of Cloyne